David Key may refer to:

 David M. Key (1824–1900), U.S. Senator from Tennessee, U.S. Postmaster General and judge
 David McK. Key (1900–1988), American diplomat
 David Key (American football) (born 1968), American football player